The Night Closed Down is a novel by F. J. Thwaites.

References

External links
The Night Closed Down at AustLit

1948 Australian novels